SS Adriatic was the first of two White Star Line ocean liners to carry the name Adriatic. The White Star Line's first four steamships, the (Oceanic (I), Atlantic, Baltic, and the Republic) met with great success in the trans-Atlantic market, and the line decided to build two more. The first of these was the SS Adriatic, which was built by Harland and Wolff and launched on 17 October 1871; the second was the Celtic.

History
During the remainder of 1871 and the early part of 1872, Adriatic was fitted out. As a part of this process, a technology new to that era was tried on the ship. Up to this point, ships' cabins had been lit by oil lamps, but the builders decided to try new gas lamps on Adriatic. A machine was added to the engine room to produce gas from coal, the first ship in the world to have such a system, but problems with gas leaks meant it had to be removed before the ship went into service.

Adriatic left on her maiden voyage on 11 April 1872, sailing from Liverpool to New York, under Captain Sir Digby Murray, who had captained the maiden voyage of the White Star's first ship, Oceanic the year before. Her hull was painted black in typical White Star fashion, and accommodated two classes, First and Steerage. As the largest of the six White Star Line ships, Adriatic received the designation as the Line's flagship, a title she held until the larger Britannic came on line in 1874.

A month later, during a subsequent Atlantic crossing to New York, Adriatic maintained an average speed of 14.52 knots and won the Blue Riband away from the Cunard Line's Scotia, which she held since 1866.

On 4 January 1873, Adriatic rescued the crew of the Norwegian barque Carmen, which had become waterlogged in the Atlantic Ocean whilst on a voyage from Saint George, New Brunswick, Canada to Liverpool. Adriatic was involved in several accidents. The first occurred in October 1874, when she collided with the Cunard Line's Parthia while sailing parallel. There was little damage to either ship. On 8 March, 1875, Adriatic rammed the British schooner Columbus in the Crosby Channel at Liverpool; Columbus was sunk and her captain's child was drowned, but the other seven people on board were rescued by the steamship Enterprise. Adriatic was held solely to blame for the collision. A claim that Columbus was not showing any lights was dismissed and Adriatic had failed to go to the assistance of Columbus.

In December of the same year, in St. Georges Channel, Adriatic ran down and sank the sailing vessel Harvest Queen in an accident that resulted in the loss of all life aboard Harvest Queen. Harvest Queen sank so quickly that the crew of Adriatic could not identify what ship they had hit, and only a records search later showed who the victim had been. Later that day, she collided with and sank the brig G. A. Pike off of South Wales, killing five crew on board Pike. Blame was fixed on Adriatic for excessive speed.

In 1883, Adriatic carried copper wire bars from New York to Liverpool that were subsequently used to create the first ever London Metal Exchange warrant issued by the company Henry Bath & Son Ltd.

In 1884, Adriatic underwent a refit, during which accommodations for 50 second class passengers were added. 

On October 4th 1889, the Adriatic crashed into the New York piers while docking. Her starboard anchor crashed 50ft (15.45m) through the new dock house with the well-wishers running away for cover.

In 1897, she was deemed too old for regular trans-Atlantic service, and was laid up as a reserve ship for the Line, at Birkenhead. When RMS Oceanic entered service in 1899, Adriatic was sold for scrap, arriving in Preston on 12 February.

References

External links 

 Adriatic I at Titanic-Titanic

1871 ships
Ships built in Belfast
Steamships of the United Kingdom
Blue Riband holders
Ships of the White Star Line
Ships built by Harland and Wolff
Maritime incidents in March 1875
Maritime incidents in December 1875
Maritime incidents in July 1878